The Simpson Medal is an individual prize awarded for Australian rules football in Western Australia. The medal has been donated by Dr Fred Simpson and family since 1945.

Simpson Medals are currently awarded to the following players:
The best player on the ground in the West Australian Football League Grand Final (awarded annually since 1945), and
the best Western Australian player on the ground in any interstate representative match contested by a West Australian Football League composite team (awarded annually since 1994).

Simpson Medals have also been awarded under other criteria in interstate football throughout history:
To the best player on the ground from either team in any stand-alone interstate representative match played in Western Australia from 1948 until 1993, including State of Origin matches from 1977 until 1993 (this did not include National Carnival matches),
to the best Western Australian player across a tournament of interstate representative matches involving Western Australia (this included National Carnivals from 1950 until 1979, the 1988 Bicentennial Carnival, and Western Australia's 1964 interstate tour), and
to the best player on the ground in club exhibition matches between a Western Australian club and an interstate club (in 1946 and 1947 only).

After 1994, the interstate Simpson Medal was strictly awarded for WAFL representative matches and not for State of Origin matches. A separate medal - the Graham Moss Medal - has been awarded to Western Australia's best player in State of Origin matches since that time.

Simpson Medal Winners

WAFL Grand Final

Interstate/State of Origin

* Cable's 1977 Simpson Medal was retrospectively awarded in 2007.afl.com.au wafl.com.au

In 2020, due to COVID-19 Restrictions, the State Game was not played

References
 http://www.wafootball.com.au/resources/history/simpson-medalists-grand-final/download.html Simpson Medalists in WAFL Grand Final
 http://www.wafootball.com.au/resources/history/simpson-medalists-state-game/download.html Simpson Medalists in State Games

Australian rules football awards
West Australian Football League